† Daphnobela is an extinct genus of predatory sea snails, marine gastropod molluscs in the family Fasciolariidae. 

This genus was first described by Maurice Cossmann in 1896.

Selected species
 D. amblia
 D. gracillima
 D. juncea
 D. junceum
 D. manti
 D. miocaenica
 D. pumila
Synonyms
 Daphnobela (Carinapex) Dall, 1924: synonym of Carinapex Dall, 1924 (original rank)
 Daphnobela minutissima  (Garrett, 1873): synonym of Carinapex minutissima (Garrett, 1873)

References

External links
 Cossmann, M. (1896). Essais de paléoconchologie comparée. Deuxième livraison. Paris, The author and Comptoir Géologique. 179 pp., 8 pls.

Fasciolariidae
Gastropods described in 1896
Prehistoric gastropod genera
Eocene first appearances
Miocene extinctions